Lunatic Lake is a lake in Aleutians West Census Area, Alaska, in the United States.

Lunatic Lake was so named because the U.S. military needed a name to begin with the letter L in order to fit with their alphabetical naming system.

See also
List of lakes in Alaska

References

Lakes of Alaska
Bodies of water of Aleutians West Census Area, Alaska